The Academia Belgica is an academic organization. The goal of the Academy is to promote the cultural, scientific and artistic cooperation between Italy and Belgium.

The organization was founded in 1939 when the Belgian princess Marie-José married the Italian crown prince Umberto. The Academy is also the seat of the Belgian Historical Institute in Rome and of the foundation princess Marie-José, which supports historical research.

In 1947, Franz Cumont donated his library to the Academia Belgica. Pierre Bautier and Henri Pirenne, also donated collections to the academy.

Directors of the Academy
  Jules Vannerus (1939–1940) 
  Fernand De Visscher (1945–1949) 
  Fernand Vercauteren (1949–1954) 
  William Lameere (1954–1959) 
  Charles Verlinden (1959–1977) 
  Jan Albert Van Houtte (1977–1983) 
  Louis Godart (1983–1988) 
  Jozef Mertens (1988–1993) 
  Jacqueline Hamesse (1993–2003) 
  Walter Geerts (2003–2012)
  Wouter Bracke (2012-2018)
  Sabine Van Sprang (since 2018)

See also

 Academia Europaea
 Belgian Federal Science Policy Office (BELSPO)
 National Fund for Scientific Research
 Royal Library of Belgium
 Science and technology in Belgium
 The Royal Academies for Science and the Arts of Belgium
 University Foundation

External links

 

Learned societies of Belgium
Academic transfer
Organizations established in 1939
Foundations based in Belgium
1939 establishments in Belgium
1939 establishments in Italy
Belgium–Italy relations